Sulcatistroma is a monotypic genus of fungi. It contains the sole species Sulcatistroma nolinae. The position of this genus within the order Calosphaeriales is unknown.

References

External links 

Monotypic Sordariomycetes genera
Calosphaeriales